Gérard Raulet (born 9 August 1949) is a French philosopher, Germanist, and translator, specializing primarily in the thought of Herbert Marcuse and Ernst Bloch. He is a professor emeritus of German History and Thought at the Paris-Sorbonne University.

Early life and education
Raulet was born 9 August 1949 in Sceaux, Hauts-de-Seine. Raulet studied at Saint-Cloud École Normale Superieure, graduating in 1969. Raulet then qualified as a German instructor in 1973, earned his PhD in 1981, and doctorat d'État in 1985.

Career
A prolific author, Raulet has devoted several works to German philosophers such as Walter Benjamin, Max Scheler, Karl Marx.   He is also the author of publications on the culture of Weimar and German political philosophy.   He is the translator of the article by Jürgen Habermas called "The Enlightenment, an unfinished project" in response to the postmodernist criticism, on which Raulet himself worked.

Between 1975 and 1987, Raulet was first an instructor and then assistant professor at the Paris-Sorbonne University before joining the university of University of Rennes 2 as a professor in 1987. He then taught at the university of Paris-XII before joining the École normale supérieure de Lyon in 1997. Raulet taught at the École normale supérieure de Lyon until 2003, after which he rejoined the Paris-Sorbonne University where is currently a professor emeritus.

Herbert Marcuse
Raulet has written extensively on the subject of the Frankfurt School, with specific attention to Herbert Marcuse, the subject of his  Herbert Marcuse: Philosophie de l'emancipation published in 1992. Raulet argues that the notion of emancipation is central to Marcuse's philosophy, as Marcuse sought to develop a third position between conceptions of utopian emancipation in Soviet Marxism and those of human nature latent in American capitalism. Philosopher Joseph Bien regarded the text as one of the most important works on Marcuse published in the late twentieth century, and Raulet as "one of France's more important, younger, social philosophers."

Bibliography

Selected Articles in English

 "What Good is Schopenhauer? Remarks on Horkheimer's Pessimism." Telos, no. 42 (1979): 98-106. doi: 10.3817/1279042098
 "The Agony of Marxism and the Victory of the Left." Telos, no. 55 (1983): 163–178. doi: 10.3817/0383055163
 "Marxism and the post-modern condition." Telos, no. 67 (1986): 147–162. doi: 10.3817/0386067147
 "The new utopia: communication technologies." Telos, no. 87 (1991): 39–58. doi: 10.3817/0391087039
 "Legitimacy and globalization." Philosophy & Social Criticism 37, no. 3 (2011): 313–323. doi: 10.1177/0191453710389445

Books in English

 Critical Cosmology: On Nations and Globalization: a Philosophical Essay. Lexington books, 2005.

Notes

20th-century French philosophers
21st-century French philosophers
Continental philosophers
Walter Benjamin scholars
German–French translators
Germanists
École Normale Supérieure alumni
Academic staff of Rennes 2 University
People from Épernay
1949 births
Living people